Zachary Lucky (born January 4, 1989) is a Canadian songwriter, folk and Country artist based in Saskatoon, Saskatchewan. He is the grandson of Canadian country music legend Smilin Johnny Lucky.

Career 
Prior to starting his solo career in 2009, Lucky was a member of pop bands Tuxedo Mask and We Were Lovers. Lucky has made a name for himself as one of the hardest working singer songwriters to come out of Saskatchewan in recent years - often booking long, and potentially gruelling tours.

To date Lucky has nine releases: three EPs and six full length albums Come and Gone, Saskatchewan, The Ballad of Losing You and Everywhere a Man Can Be.

Discography

Albums
Come and Gone (August 5, 2010)
Saskatchewan (March 6, 2012)
The Ballad of Losing You (September 17, 2013)
Everywhere a Man Can Be (October 7, 2016)
Midwestern (October 18, 2019)
Songs for Hard Times (November 5, 2021)

EPs
Common Dialogue (March 2, 2008)
Maps and Towns (April 14, 2009)
In the Fields, in the Hills (October 2, 2009)

References

http://www.saskatoonjazzsociety.com/2014/08/zachary-lucky-with-mandy-ringdal/

External links

1989 births
Living people
Musicians from Saskatoon
Canadian folk singer-songwriters
Canadian male singer-songwriters
21st-century Canadian male singers